"Kanashimi wa Kitto" is the 14th single released by the Japanese rock band Uverworld. Released on October 28, 2009, it reached #2 on Japanese Oricon Weekly Charts.

The song "Kanashimi wa Kitto" is the soundtrack of the Japanese television drama titled "Shōkōjo Seira" (based on A Little Princess), played by Shida Mirai.

Track listing

CD 
  哀しみはきっと (Kanashimi wa Kitto)
  撃破 (Gekiha)
  美影意志-single ver.- (Mikage-ishi single ver.)

DVD 
 Uverworld Classics Vol.2 Sora
 AwakEve Tour '09 Additional Order (from 国立代々木競技場第一体育館　09.04.05)

 Groovy Groovy Groovy
 D-tecnoLife

References

2009 singles
2009 songs
Uverworld songs
Japanese television drama theme songs
Gr8! Records singles